Tethydidae is a family of dendronotid nudibranch gastropod mollusks in the superfamily Tritonioidea.

The original spelling (subfamily) is Tethydia. It was placed on the Official List by Opinion 1182 of ICZN (1981: 174), which also ruled that the name should be corrected to Tethydidae (Bouchet & Rocroi, 2005).

Taxonomy 
This family is within the clade Cladobranchia and has no subfamilies (according to the taxonomy of the Gastropoda by Bouchet & Rocroi, 2005).

Genera 
There are two genera within the family Tethydidae:
 Melibe Rang, 1829
 Tethys Linnaeus, 1767 - the type genus, 
Genera brought into synonymy 
 Chioraera Gould, 1852 accepted as Melibe Rang, 1829
 Fimbria O'Donoghue, 1926: synonym of Tethys Linnaeus, 1767 (invalid: junior homonym of Fimbria Megerle, 1811.)
 Jacunia de Filippi, 1867 accepted as Melibe Rang, 1829
 Melibaea synonym of  Melibe Rang, 1829
 Meliboea [sic] : Melibe Rang, 1829 (incorrect subsequent spelling [by Forbes, 1838] of Melibe Rang, 1829)
 Propemelibe Allan, 1932 accepted as Melibe Rang, 1829

Description 
Species in this family do not possess a radula.

References

External links 

 Forbes E. (1844). Report on the Mollusca and Radiata of the Aegean sea, and on their distribution, considered as bearing on geology. Reports of the British Association for the Advancement of Science for 1843. 130-193
  Goodheart, J. A.; Bazinet, A. L.; Valdés, Á.; Collins, A. G.; Cummings, M. P. (2017). Prey preference follows phylogeny: evolutionary dietary patterns within the marine gastropod group Cladobranchia (Gastropoda: Heterobranchia: Nudibranchia). BMC Evolutionary Biology. 17(1)

 
Taxa named by Constantine Samuel Rafinesque